Colin Milne (c.1743–1815) was a Scottish priest of the Church of England and botanist.

Life
Born at Aberdeen about 1743, Milne was educated at Marischal College there under his uncle, Dr. Campbell, and later received the degree of LL.D. from the university. He moved to Edinburgh, and became tutor to Lord Algernon Percy. Taking Anglican orders, he made a reputation as a preacher.

Milne was appointed evening preacher to the City of London Lying-in Hospital, and lecturer to both the Old and the New Church at Deptford. Subsequently made rector of North Chapel, near Petworth in Sussex, he continued, however, to reside at Deptford where in 1783 he founded the Kent Dispensary, which became the Miller Hospital, Greenwich. He was a prominent promoter of the Royal Humane Society, and several times preached the anniversary sermon for the society.

Milne died at Deptford on 2 October 1815.

Works
Milne published:

 A Botanical Dictionary, or Elements of Systematic and Philosophical Botany, 1770, dedicated to the Duke of Northumberland, 2nd ed. 1778, 3rd ed. 1805. 
 Institutes of Botany, a Translation of the Genera Plantarum of Linnæus, pt. i. 1771, pt. ii. 1772, not completed. 
 Sermons, 1780. As a botanist Milne was chosen to preach the Fairchild sermon, and sermons which he delivered before the Grand Lodge of Freemasons and at the Maidstone assizes were also printed.
 Indigenous Botany … the result of several Botanical Excursions chiefly in Kent, Middlesex, and the adjacent Counties in 1790, 1791, and 1793, vol. i. only issued, 1793. Written with Alexander Gordon M.D. of Aberdeen, "reader in botany in London", and son of James Gordon, a nurseryman of Mile End who corresponded with Linnæus.

Notes

Attribution

1743 births
1815 deaths
Alumni of the University of Aberdeen
18th-century Scottish Episcopalian priests
Scottish botanists
Clergy from Aberdeen
19th-century English Anglican priests